The Roissy–Picardie Link is a planned railway line near Paris.

Route
The Roissy–Picardie Link would link the LGV Interconnexion Est, at Paris-Charles de Gaulle Airport, to a regional railway line heading north towards Creil. This would allow direct rail connections between Charles de Gaulle Airport and towns to the north.

Project

The public enquiry is expected to be complete by 2014, with the line entering service in 2020.

See also
LGV Picardie
LGV Nord

References

High-speed railway lines in France
Railway lines in Hauts-de-France
Proposed railway lines in France